The women's shot put event at the 2002 Asian Athletics Championships was held in Colombo, Sri Lanka on 12 August.

Results

References

2002 Asian Athletics Championships
Shot put at the Asian Athletics Championships
2002 in women's athletics